G. sylvestris may refer to:
 Gallirallus sylvestris, the Lord Howe woodhen, a flightless bird species
 Glyphonycteris sylvestris, the tricolored big-eared bat, a bat species from South and Central America

See also
 Sylvestris (disambiguation)